Blepharosis is a genus of moths of the family Noctuidae.

Species
 Blepharosis anachoretoides (Alphéraky, 1892)
 Blepharosis bryocharis Boursin, 1964
 Blepharosis dianthoecina (Staudinger, 1895)
 Blepharosis griseirufa (Hampson, 1894)
 Blepharosis illecebrosa (Püngeler, 1906)
 Blepharosis lama (Püngeler, 1900)
 Blepharosis paspa (Püngeler, 1900)
 Blepharosis poecila (Draudt, 1950)
 Blepharosis retracta (Draudt, 1950)
 Blepharosis retrahens (Draudt, 1950)
 Blepharosis smaragdistis (Draudt, 1950)
 Blepharosis sublimbatus (Püngeler, 1899)
 Blepharosis sumbarginata (Bang-Haas 1927)

References
 Blepharosis at Markku Savela's Lepidoptera and Some Other Life Forms
 Natural History Museum Lepidoptera genus database

Cuculliinae